The 1927 UCI Road World Championships took place in Nürburgring, Germany.

Professional and amateur riders rode together (33 of the starters were amateurs).
55 riders started, 18 classified finishers, 182.5 km, winner's average speed 27.55 km/hr

Events summary

References

 
UCI Road World Championships by year
W
R
International cycle races hosted by Germany
July 1927 sports events